Pieter "Piet" van der Velden (5 September 1899 - 2 April 1975) was a Dutch male water polo player. He was a member of the Netherlands men's national water polo team. He was a part of the team at the 1920 Summer Olympics.

References

External links
 

1899 births
1975 deaths
Dutch male water polo players
Olympic water polo players of the Netherlands
Water polo players from Amsterdam
Water polo players at the 1920 Summer Olympics
20th-century Dutch people